The 2014–15 I liga is the 7th season of the Polish I liga under its current title, and the 67th season of the second highest division in the Polish football league system since its establishment in 1949. The league is operated by the Polish Football Association (PZPN). The league is contested by 18 teams. The regular season was played in a round-robin tournament. The season began on 1 August 2014, and concluded on 6 June 2015. After the 19th matchday the league will be on winter break between 1 December 2014 and 6 March 2015.

According to the competition rules, all clubs are required to field at least one youth player (born on 1994 or later and Polish or trained in Poland) in every game (except for the times when the only youth player on the roster is sent off or unable to continue playing).

Changes from last season
The following teams have changed division since the 2013–14 season.

To I liga
Promoted from II liga East
 Wigry Suwałki
 Pogoń Siedlce
Promoted from II liga West
 Chrobry Głogów
 Bytovia Bytów
Relegated from Ekstraklasa
 Widzew Łódź
 Zagłębie Lubin

From I liga
Relegated to II liga
 Puszcza Niepołomice
 Energetyk ROW Rybnik
 Okocimski KS Brzesko
Dissolved
 Kolejarz Stróże
Promoted to Ekstraklasa
 GKS Bełchatów
 Górnik Łęczna

Notes
 Kolejarz Stróże did not receive the license for the 2014–15 season. As a result, the 15th-placed Stomil Olsztyn stayed in I liga for the next season.

Team overview

Stadia and locations

League table

Results

I liga play-off
The 15th place team from the regular season will compete in a play-off with the 4th place team from II liga. Matches will be played on 14 and 20 June 2015. The winner will compete in the I liga.

3–3 on aggregate. Pogoń Siedlce won on away goals and stayed in I liga for next season.

Season statistics

Top goalscorers

References

External links
 soccerway.com

2014–15 in Polish football
Pol
I liga seasons